Helene Cramer (13 December 1844 – 14 April 1916) was a German flower, landscape and portrait painter.

Life 
Cramer came from a wealthy merchant family in Hamburg-Uhlenhorst. Like her sister, the painter Molly Cramer, she also began her training as a painter in 1882 after the death of their father Cesar Cramer. At the beginning of their studies Helene was 38 years old. The sisters first teachers were the Hamburg illustrator  as well as the painters Carl Rodeck and Carl Oesterley. At the end of the 1880s Helene Cramer went to The Hague to train under Margaretha Roosenboom and together with her sister at the Belgian still life painter Eugène Joors in Antwerp. Joors taught them in the art of still life painting.

Returning to Hamburg, Helene Cramer mainly painted still life flower pieces. Her works were regularly exhibited at major German exhibitions, such as at the Glass Palace Munich and the Great Berlin Art Exhibition (Große Berliner Kunstausstellung). In Berlin she exhibited several times between 1893 and 1908, always with her sister Molly. She also exhibited her work at the Palace of Fine Arts and The Woman's Building at the 1893 World's Columbian Exposition in Chicago, Illinois, and in 1900 at the Woman's Exhibition, Earl's Court, London with: Fir Forest; Trapäolum; Narzissen; Morgensonne im Wald; Gloxinien and Fuchsien.

In 1896 the director of the Kunsthalle Hamburg Alfred Lichtwark acquired some of the Cramer sister's pictures for the Collection of pictures from Hamburg. Lichtwark, who often frequented the sisters house at Uhlenhorst, also established contact with members of the Hamburg Artists' Club of 1897 (Hamburgischer Künstlerklub), including among others ,  and Paul Kayser. Through visits by the artists in their house, this became an artistic achievement at the beginning of the 20th century. Without joining the club, the sisters later exhibited their paintings together with them.

Helene Cramer was a member of the Allgemeine Deutsche Kunstgenossenschaft, the Association of North-West German Artists, in the Berlin Association of Women Artists and in the Association of (Women) Authors and Artists of Vienna.

Helene Cramer died in 1916 in her 72nd year, the gravestones of Helene and Molly Cramer are in the Garden of Women at the Hamburg Ohlsdorf Cemetery.

See also
 List of German painters
 List of German women artists

Footnotes

References
 
 Allgemeines Künstlerlexikon. Die Bildenden Künstler aller Zeiten und Völker (AKL). vol 22, Saur, München 1999, p. 161. (in German)
 Petra Wiechens: Hamburger Künstlerinnen der Avantgarde (Avant-garde Hamburg artists). Hamburg 2006. . (in German)
 Ernst Rump (ed.), Kay Rump (pub.), Maike Bruhns (pub.): Der Neue Rump. Lexikon der Bildenden Künstler Hamburgs, Altonas und der näheren Umgebung. 2. Auflage. Verlag Wachtholz, Neumünster 2005, p. 82. (in German)

External links
 
 Auction-results from Helene Cramer at Artnet

1844 births
1916 deaths
German women painters
German Impressionist painters
German still life painters
19th-century German women artists
20th-century German women artists
19th-century German painters
20th-century German painters
Artists from Hamburg
People from Hamburg-Nord